The National Committee on Federal Legislation for Birth Control was a birth control lobbying organization set up in 1929 in Chicago by Margaret Sanger and the Illinois Birth Control League.

The organization was set up into four regional sections. Its headquarters was moved to Washington, D.C. in 1933. The committee was disbanded in 1937, six months after the successful outcome in favor of birth control of the court case United States v. One Package of Japanese Pessaries.

References

See also 
 Birth control movement in the United States

Birth control in the United States
1929 establishments in Illinois
1937 disestablishments in Washington, D.C.
Organizations established in 1929
Organizations disestablished in 1937